Assassin's Creed: Brahman is a graphic novel published by UbiWorkshop in October 2013. Set in the Assassin's Creed universe, it tells the story of Arbaaz Mir, a member of the Indian Brotherhood of Assassins, who fights the increasing influence and occupation of the East India Company while also clashing with the Assassins' longtime enemies, the Templar Order. The novel also features a framing story, set in 2013, which follows programmer Jot Soora and his fiancée, Monima Das, the latter of whom is a descendant of Arbaaz.

The novel is written by Cameron Stewart and Karl Kerschl, who previously worked on the comic book miniseries Assassin's Creed: The Fall, and its graphic novel follow-up, Assassin's Creed: The Chain. A video game sequel to Brahman, Assassin's Creed Chronicles: India, was released in January 2016.

Plot
Brahman explores the nature of identity through several generations of Assassins. The main plot is set in India in 1839, during the Sikh Empire, and follows Master Assassin Arbaaz Mir (literally: The Hawk Aristocrat) of the Indian Brotherhood. As political tensions begin to arise between the Sikh Empire and the British's East India Company, Arbaaz must face a longtime foe who has subjugated his land and people and who is now in possession of an artifact believed to be a powerful Piece of Eden.

The modern-day story is centered on Jot Soora, a programmer at the Bangalore-based company MysoreTech and the fiancé of famous film actress Monima Das. One day, Jot brings an Animus console home, which Monima uses to access her genetic memories while Jot is asleep. Monima relives Arbaaz's memories, learning of the secret struggle between the Assassins and Templars, and that she is descended from Arbaaz and princess Pyara Kaur (granddaughter of Ranjit Singh, the founder of the Sikh Empire). It is later revealed that Jot is a descendant of Raza, Arbaaz's mute servant and companion, and that MysoreTech is actually controlled by Abstergo Industries (the Templars of the modern-day). The Animus consoles distributed by MysoreTech across India were meant to help Abstergo locate a living descendant of Arbaaz, so that through their genetic memories, Abstergo could learn what Arbaaz had done with the artifact he had recovered from the Templars.

Notes

External links
 at UbiWorkshop
 at UbiWorkshop

2014 comics debuts
Comics based on Assassin's Creed
Comics set in India
Sikh Empire in fiction